"Malibu" is a song by American singer Miley Cyrus, released as the lead single from her sixth studio album, Younger Now. Its lyrics were written by Cyrus and its music and production was done by Cyrus and Oren Yoel. The song premiered on Beats 1 on May 11, 2017, and was subsequently released for digital download and streaming by RCA Records. The song was commercially successful, reaching number ten in the US, and number eleven in the UK. The song became her ninth top-ten entry on the Billboard Hot 100 chart.

The song discusses Cyrus' relationship with her then-fiancé and The Last Song co-star, Liam Hemsworth. Critics viewed "Malibu" as indicative of Cyrus' transition into becoming a more mellow artist, and more removed from her previously controversial image. An accompanying music video was released on the same day as the song. It features Cyrus in various all-white outfits as she is shown frolicking in various outdoor locations.

Background and release

Following the release of her fifth studio album, Miley Cyrus & Her Dead Petz, Cyrus resumed working on her upcoming sixth studio album. Cyrus announced in October 2016 that she was re-engaged to actor and now ex-husband Liam Hemsworth, with whom she starred in the Nicholas Sparks film adaptation of the novel of the same name, The Last Song. Cyrus wrote "Malibu" while taking an Uber on her way to her job on The Voice.

"Malibu" was first announced in a May 2017 cover story for Billboard magazine, where Cyrus announced that the song, which would be the lead single from her upcoming sixth studio album, which was later announced to be titled Younger Now, and it would be released on May 11, 2017. In the same interview, she also addressed being sober for three weeks prior, and noting that this affected the song. While its title references the city of Malibu, California, the song mainly discusses her relationship with Hemsworth. Cyrus described the song as being about "finding a new love with an old love", and about finding a "new freedom" in that. The production of the song was handled by Oren Yoel, with whom Cyrus worked on songs such as "Adore You".

The cover artwork of "Malibu" was revealed on May 10, showing Cyrus lying on top of the grass back in her backyard, with her engagement ring on; it was taken by Hemsworth. The song first premiered on Beats 1 on May 11, 2017, presented by Zane Lowe. It was then released for streaming on Apple Music and other streaming platforms.

Composition and lyrical interpretation
Rolling Stone characterized the song as pop rock, whereas Spin described it as "SoCal soft rock". It is performed in the key of A major with a tempo of 140 beats per minute. Cyrus' vocals span from E3 to F4.

The song's lyrics differ from Cyrus's previous two albums, and provide introspection on her love life with Liam Hemsworth, whom she lived with in Malibu at the time of writing the song. The New York Times said Cyrus sings about "past insecurities, current contentment and 'Hoping I just stay the same, and nothing will change/And it'll be us, just for a while.'"

Critical reception
"Malibu" received mixed reviews from music critics. The New York Times Jon Pareles described the song as "nice as can be", saying, "The only shock is that there's no shock." Jon Blistein of Rolling Stone called "Malibu" a "stripped-down song ... [which] buoys Cyrus' simple vocals and lovestruck lyrics." Forbes writer Hugh McIntyre says "'Malibu' is unexpected upon first listen", and notes Cyrus "has gone in an Americana direction, opting for a guitar-based composition instead of the electronic sound her fans have become used to over the past few years." Joey Nolfi of Entertainment Weekly gave the song a positive review, describing it as "minimal, refreshing, and simple in tone", as well as "radio-friendly". Time's Raisa Bruner called "Malibu" a "stripped-down" and "breezy" track, and noted that the track deviates from her previous work, which included "zany stage antics" and "conversation-sparking politics".

Amanda Petrusich of The New Yorker recognised the musical strength of the song, stating "Musically, 'Malibu' is a mix of Laurel Canyon and Nashville, equal parts bohemian and smarmy; it is as if Dolly Parton were finally called upon to sing a late-era Stevie Nicks track"; however, the review called Cyrus' performance of it "lifeless", writing that her disposal to the hip-hop culture she once embraced now feels "disingenuous, if not sinister". Petrusich stated that "this is too bad, because Cyrus has a rich, husky voice, and, when she inhabits it with more gusto, like on her previous singles "The Climb" and "Wrecking Ball" it conveys both fragility and tremendous strength." Pitchfork writer Jillian Mapes found the song "sedated", "wholly inoffensive", and "a shrug of a song", while saying that "[Malibu is] so breezy, it makes Sheryl Crow seem edgy, or Lady Gaga's Joanne resemble a legit rock'n'roll reinvention." Variety writer Chris Willman called it "sweet" and "deeply felt", praising Cyrus's "guilelessness" and Oren Yoel's production skills while also comparing her sound on the song to that of Seals and Crofts, but adding that the track itself has "any number of clunker lines" and non-sequiturs. Spin Andy Cush said that while it boasts "earnest lyrics, unfussy production with handclaps and clean electric guitars, [and] a mild twang to remind you of her status as the progeny of a country star", he found the track to be "utterly inoffensive" and that Cyrus's persona in "Malibu" felt like "her most deliberately constructed persona yet", while likening her sound to that of Sheryl Crow and Don Henley.

Commercial performance
In the United States, with less than a day of tracking, "Malibu" debuted at number 64 on the  Billboard Hot 100 with 29,000 downloads and 4 million streams. In its first full week, the single soared to number 10 with 77,000 copies sold (106,000 total), 21.5 million streams, and logged 13.5 million in airplay audience. The feat makes "Malibu" Cyrus' ninth top 10 entry on the chart and her first since "Wrecking Ball" in 2013. On the Billboard Adult Contemporary chart the song debuted at number 27 the week of July 15, 2017 with 103 spins and 0.167 million audience impressions across American adult contemporary radio stations. "Malibu" has moved 1 million equivalent units in the United States as of September 2017.

In United Kingdom, the single debuted at number eleven on the UK Singles Chart, becoming her fourth song to peak at this position. In Oceania, "Malibu" peaked at number three on the ARIA Charts in Australia and at number four on the Official New Zealand Music Chart.

Music video
The music video for "Malibu" was released on May 11, 2017, and was directed by Cyrus and Diane Martel. The music video features several shots of Cyrus on a beach with balloons, sitting in front of a waterfall, in wildflower fields, and running with a dog, all while dressed in various white outfits. In the video, she also shows her engagement ring. It garnered over 50 million views within its first two weeks.

Live performances

Cyrus performed "Malibu" live for the first time at Wango Tango on May 13, 2017, as a special guest performer. A little over a week later, she gave her first televised performance of the track at the 2017 Billboard Music Awards on May 21. She was introduced by both her father, Billy Ray Cyrus, and sister, Noah Cyrus, before performing the song. She wore a pair of white jean shorts, a white crop top, and a tan cowboy hat. Cyrus began to choke up towards the end of the performance, becoming teary-eyed and thanking her fans. A day later, she performed the song on The Voice finale, in front of a forest-themed backdrop similar to in the song's music video. She prefaced the performance by dedicating it to Ariana Grande and the victims of the Manchester Arena bombing, which had occurred 2 
two days prior to her performance, saying, "I'd like to dedicate this song to my good friend Ariana Grande and to everyone who experienced that horrific attack yesterday. Our hearts are with you." On May 26, Cyrus also performed the song on the Today show as part as their Citi Concert series.

On June 10, Cyrus performed "Malibu" during the iHeartRadio Summer Pool Party. She also performed the song on The Tonight Show Starring Jimmy Fallon, along with "Inspired" which Fallon called her "the real deal", the following Wednesday. On September 15, Cyrus performed "Malibu" for the BBC Radio 1 Live Lounge, accompanied with other songs like "Younger Now", "See You Again", "Party in the U.S.A." and a cover of Roberta Flack's "The First Time Ever I Saw Your Face".

Track listing

Digital download
 "Malibu" – 3:51
Digital download – The Him Remix
 "Malibu" (The Him Remix) – 3:38
Digital download – Tiësto Remix
 "Malibu" (Tiësto Remix) – 3:19
Digital download – Lost Frequencies Remix
 "Malibu" (Lost Frequencies Remix) – 3:20

Digital download – Gigamesh Remix
 "Malibu" (Gigamesh Remix) – 3:22
Digital download – Dillon Francis Remix
 "Malibu" (Dillon Francis Remix) – 3:41
Digital download – Alan Walker Remix
 "Malibu" (Alan Walker Remix) – 3:06

Charts

Weekly charts

Year-end charts

Certifications

Release history

References

2017 singles
2017 songs
Miley Cyrus songs
American pop rock songs
RCA Records singles
Rebecca Black songs
Song recordings produced by Oren Yoel
Song recordings produced by Miley Cyrus
Songs about California
Songs written by Miley Cyrus
Music videos directed by Diane Martel
American soft rock songs
Songs written by Oren Yoel